Salt River railway station is a Metrorail railway station in Salt River, Cape Town. It is the second station from the Cape Town terminus on the old main line to Bellville, and the junction where the Southern Line branches from the main line. Services on all of Metrorail's lines pass through the station.

The station has three island platforms and one side platform, serving a total of seven tracks. The station building is located on Foundry Street to the south of the tracks.

Services

References

Railway stations in Cape Town
Metrorail Western Cape stations